States Rights Records is an independent record label founded in 2001 by Steve Schroeder. The Portland, Oregon label's premier release was "Come Along" by Little Wings. Later that year, the label released "Tongue and Tooth" by The Badger King. Bobby Birdman, Yacht, Lucky Dragons, The Blow, The Dirty Projectors, White Rainbow and others have released on States Rights Records. Each band chooses a "state" for which their release will represent within the States Rights Records catalogue. As a result, there is no catalogue number for the releases, simply states. Atlantis, Socal, and "Far West Texas" have also been represented.

Roster
 Jason Anderson (formerly Wolf Colonel)
 Bobby Birdman
 Cains & Abels
 Count Chocula
 Department of Safety
 Dirty Projectors
 Adam Forkner
 Jib Kidder
 Lloyd & Michael (former members of Dear Nora)
 Love Letter Band
 Lucky Dragons
 Thanksgiving
 The Blow
 Urban Honking
 Xiu Xiu
 Yacht

External links
 States Rights Records website

American independent record labels
Record labels established in 2001
Indie rock record labels
Oregon record labels
Companies based in Portland, Oregon
Privately held companies based in Oregon
2001 establishments in Oregon